Pseudoleon superbus, the filigree skimmer, is a species of dragonfly in the family Libellulidae, and is the only species in the genus Pseudoleon.

References

Further reading

 
 
 
 

Libellulidae
Monotypic Odonata genera
Odonata of North America
Taxa named by William Forsell Kirby
Articles created by Qbugbot